Beautiful Eyes is the second extended play (EP) by American singer-songwriter Taylor Swift. The EP was released on July 15, 2008 by Big Machine Records exclusively to Walmart stores in the United States and online. The limited release EP has a primarily country pop sound and features alternate versions of tracks from her self-titled debut album (2006), and two original tracks ("Beautiful Eyes" and "I Heart ?"), which Swift had composed as early as 2006. "I Heart ?" was previously released for digital download with the purchase of the Best Buy-exclusive version CD of Swift's self-titled debut album in 2006. A DVD, featuring music videos of singles from her self-titled debut album, is also included on the physical release of the EP.

Beautiful Eyes peaked at number nine on the US Billboard 200 and topped Billboard's Top Country Albums chart, succeeding her self-titled debut album. "I Heart ?" was released as a promotional single in June 2008. Though the EP was not heavily promoted, Swift did not perform the title track at a few venues.

Background
Swift received much success with the release of her self-titled debut album Taylor Swift (2006), and began working on her second studio album, Fearless (2008), in 2007. During that time, she received a number of e-mails from fans requesting for new material to be released, which drove Swift into releasing Beautiful Eyes: "I thought this might tide them over till the new album comes out in the fall." Beautiful Eyes is musically oriented to country pop and contemporary music. It includes new versions of tracks from Taylor Swift: an alternate version of "Should've Said No", the fifth single from the album, an acoustic version of "Teardrops on My Guitar", the second single from the album, a radio edit of "Picture to Burn", the fourth single from the album, and "I'm Only Me when I'm with You", a promotional single from the album. The EP also features two original songs, "Beautiful Eyes" and "I Heart?", which she previously wrote in 2003. The EP's DVD features music videos from the singles from Taylor Swift, as well as a music video made for "Beautiful Eyes" from footage from Swift's eighteenth birthday party.

Swift did not want any misconceptions of Beautiful Eyes as her second album and therefore partnered with the American retail company Walmart to make the EP an exclusive release. The album was only made available through American Wal-Mart stores and Wal-Mart's website. Furthermore, it was made a limited release because Swift only allowed Big Machine Records to manufacture a certain number of copies of the EP. She said, "I’m only letting my record company make a small amount of these. The last thing I want any of you to think is that we are putting out too many releases."

Commercial performance
On the week ending August 2, 2008, Beautiful Eyes debuted at number nine on the Billboard 200 due to sales of 45,000 copies. The EP spent a total of twenty weeks on the Billboard 200. On the same week, it debuted at number one on Top Country Albums, replacing her own album Taylor Swift as the chart's number one album. With Taylor Swift charting at number two, Swift became the first artist to hold the first two positions on Top Country Albums since LeAnn Rimes charted in 1997 with Blue (1996) and Unchained Melody: The Early Years (1997). The following week, the EP slipped to number two and, in total, it spent twenty eight weeks on Top Country Albums. As of July 2019, the EP has sold 359,000 copies in the United States.

Promotion
"I Heart ?" was released as a promotional single from Beautiful Eyes on June 23, 2008. Swift promoted Beautiful Eyes minimally for the reason being she did not want for misconceptions of the EP being her second album, although she did perform the title track at different venues. She first performed "Beautiful Eyes" on January 23, 2005 at the 2005 NAMM Show, an annual music product trade show held in Anaheim, California at the Anaheim Convention Center. The performance featured Swift, dressed in a red blouse and blue jeans, performing acoustically with a guitar, sitting on a bar stool. "Beautiful Eyes" was later performed as part of Swift's set for iHeartRadio.com's Stripped on August 5, 2008; she wore a black, one-shoulder dress and performed with a back-up band while playing a rhinestoned acoustic guitar.

Track listing

Personnel
Credits adapted from the album's liner notes

 Taylor Swift – lead vocals 
 Ken Love – mastering 
 Nathan Chapman – production & acoustic guitar , harmony vocals , mixing & recording , electric guitar & additional recording 
 Robert Ellis Orrall – production & background vocals , additional recording 
 Chris Rowe – mixing, shaker, synthpad, organ & guitar , digital editing 
 Gary Burnette – guitars , bass 
 Chad Carlson – recording , mixing , additional recording 
 Wanda Vick – mandolin , banjo 
 Caitlin Evanson – fiddle & harmony vocals 
 Paul Sidoti – electric guitar & harmony vocals 
 Tony Harrell – keyboards 
 Dan Dugmore – steel 
 Ken Lewis – drums 
 Rusty Danmyer – steel 
 Eric Richardson – recording 
 Ben Clark – banjo 
 Al Wilson – drums 
 Amos Heller – bass 
 Grant Mickelson – electric guitar 
 Chuck Ainlay – mixing 
 Scott Kidd – mixing 
 Steve Short – engineering 
 Nick Buda – drums 
 Eric Darken – percussion 
 Rob Hajacos – fiddle 
 Jeff Hyde – banjo 
 Tim Marks – bass 
 Scotty Sanders – steel 
 John Willis – mandolin 
 Angelo – production 
 Jamie Tate – mixing 
 A.J. Derrick – recording 
 Steve Bryant – bass 
 Dennis Holt – drums 
 Troy Lancaster – electric guitar 
 Lorraine Morrison – background vocals 
 Curt Ryle – acoustic guitar 
 Ben Fowler – mixing 
 Jason Lefan – engineering 
 Allen Ditto – recording 
 Clarke Schleicher – recording 
 Mike Brignardello – bass 
 Shannon Forrest – drums 
 Liana Manis – background vocals

Charts

Weekly charts

Year-end charts

References

External links
 Beautiful Eyes at Taylor Swift official site: includes lyrics of all tracks.

2008 EPs
Taylor Swift EPs
Albums produced by Nathan Chapman (record producer)
Big Machine Records EPs
Albums produced by Robert Ellis Orrall
Albums produced by Angelo Petraglia